Cannock Hockey Club are an English field hockey team. They were established in 1905, and are based in the village of Hatherton, near Cannock, Staffordshire. Both the men's and women's first teams play in the England Hockey League Premier Division, the top division of hockey in England.

History
Founded in 1905, the men's first team was the most successful team in the country having won seven Men's England Hockey League titles from 1995 to 2006. Additionally they have won four National cup competitions and three Super Cup's. They have also provided several international players to England and other national teams.

Their home ground, Chase Park (formerly The Morris Ground), has hosted various national and international tournaments, including the EuroHockey Club Champions Cup in 2000 and 2006. It has also hosted England matches, particularly while the National Hockey Stadium was in use by Milton Keynes Dons football team. Chase Park was also used as a pre-games training venue for the 2012 London Olympics.

In recent years the club suffered a series of unfortunate events, with the men's first XI being relegated from the Premier Division during the 2015–16 England Hockey League season. Then in June 2019, the club found themselves locked out of their home as receivers took over the site. Players left and the club's teams struggled to find available pitches to fulfill their fixture. The club became known as the Cannock Community Hockey Club and played in local leagues, the men in the Midlands Men's League and the women in the Midlands Premier League.

However at the beginning of the 2022/23 season the club began to move upwards again with the teams being allowed to play from Chase Park again and the women's first XI playing in the Conference Midland division of the 2022–23 Women's England Hockey League season after gaining promotion the previous season.

Major National Honours
National Champions
 1995–96 Men's League Champions
 1997–98 Men's League Champions
 1998–99 Men's League Champions
 2002–03 Men's League Champions
 2003–04 Men's League Champions
 2004–05 Men's League Champions
 2005–06 Men's League Champions

National Cup winners
 1997–98 Men's Cup winners
 2001–02 Men's Cup winners
 2004–05 Men's Cup winners
 2013–14 Men's Cup winners

Premiership Tournament/Super Cup winners
 Men's 1998–1999
 Men's 1999–2000
 Men's 2004–2005

Notable players

Men's internationals

 
 Stuart Loughrey

Women's internationals

References

 
Sport in Staffordshire
English field hockey clubs
Field hockey clubs established in 1905
1905 establishments in England
Cannock